Mertensophryne usambarae (common name: Usambara forest toad) is a critically endangered species of toad in the family Bufonidae. It is endemic to the foothills of the East Usambara Mountains, northeastern Tanzania.

Description
The dorsum is brown with some weak marking; the ventral surface is immaculate or with some mottling. The parotoid glands are flattened. There is no tympanum. The legs are relatively short and densely covered with conical warts.

Habitat and conservation
It can also persist in mildly disturbed, selectively logged forests. Its breeding biology is unknown, but some other Mertensophryne species breed in puddles among tree roots (e.g., Mertensophryne anotis), and this could apply to this species too. Mertensophryne usambarae is ecologically similar to Mertensophryne micranotis, and these two species can co-occur.

The species is only known from three sites that are close to each other. It appears to be uncommon; i.e., three days of intensive survey effort in 2012 only revealed two specimens. It is threatened by habitat loss caused by agricultural encroachment, wood extraction, and human settlement. The known sites are all forest reserves (Kwamgumi, Segoma and Mtai Forest Reserves), but they are not well protected. Because of the very small range and threats to the habitat, the International Union for Conservation of Nature (IUCN) assessed this species as "Critically Endangered" in 2016.

References

usambarae
Amphibians of Tanzania
Endemic fauna of Tanzania
Amphibians described in 1999
Taxonomy articles created by Polbot